Permission is a 2017 American romantic comedy-drama film written and directed by Brian Crano. The film stars Rebecca Hall as a woman on the brink of a marriage proposal from her boyfriend (Dan Stevens), but is impeded by the suggestion of her brother (David Joseph Craig) and his life partner (Morgan Spector) to "test date" other men before she ultimately settles down. Meanwhile, the film also follows the relationship of the gay couple as they decide whether or not to become parents.

Cast
 Rebecca Hall as Anna, Hale's sister and Will's girlfriend
 Dan Stevens as Will, Anna's boyfriend and Reece's co-worker
 David Joseph Craig as Hale, Anna's brother and Reece's boyfriend
 Morgan Spector as Reece, Hale's boyfriend and Will's co-worker
 Gina Gershon as Lydia
 Jason Sudeikis as Glenn
 Bridget Everett as Charlie
 François Arnaud as Dane
 Raúl Castillo as Heron
 Sarah Steele as Stevie
 Michelle Hurst as Dr. Bennett

Release
Permission acquired international distribution rights from London-based Film Constellation.

The film premiered at the Tribeca Film Festival to positive reviews. Good Deed Entertainment acquired the U.S. distribution rights. The film was released in the United States on February 9, 2018.

Reception
On review aggregator website Rotten Tomatoes, the film holds an approval rating of 68% based on 44 reviews, and an average rating of 6.2/10. The critical consensus reads: "Permission holds together in spite of its uneven narrative thanks to eminently watchable work from leads Rebecca Hall and Dan Stevens." On Metacritic, the film has a weighted average score of 62 out of 100, based on 15 critics, indicating "generally favorable reviews".

References

External links
 
 Permission at Tribeca Film Festival website

2017 films
2017 LGBT-related films
2017 romantic comedy-drama films
2010s sex comedy films
American LGBT-related films
American romantic comedy-drama films
American sex comedy films
Films set in Brooklyn
Gay-related films
LGBT-related romantic comedy-drama films
2010s English-language films
2010s American films